MediGuard.org, operated by iGuard Inc., monitors the safety of prescribed medicines, over-the-counter medicines and healthcare supplements. As of February 2011, there are over 2,480,000 registered users in the website. The company also rates the safety of different drugs using a standardized ratings scale, and has received support from advocacy groups concerned with drug adverse effects.

The iGuard company was founded in 2007 by Hugo Stephenson, MD.  It is a subsidiary of Quintiles Transnational, a multinational contract research organization.

Criticism
Qualitative risk rating systems, such as that used by MediGuard, have been criticized for potentially simplifying risk assessment requirements used to inform risk management decisions.

See also
Boston Collaborative Drug Surveillance Program
COSTART - Coding Symbols for a Thesaurus of Adverse Reaction Terms
Pharmacovigilance
Yellow Card Scheme (UK)

References

External links
 MediGuard
 An Innovative System for Communicating Drug Risks to Patients

Companies based in Princeton, New Jersey
American medical websites
Health care companies established in 2007
2007 establishments in New Jersey
Internet properties established in 2007